Ust-Egita (Egetyn Adag) is a rural locality (a selo) in Yeravninsky District, Republic of Buryatia, Russia. The population was 1,058 as of 2010. There are 68 streets.

Geography 
Ust-Egita is located 70 km southwest of Sosnovo-Ozerskoye (the district's administrative centre) by road. Tuzhinka is the nearest rural locality.

References 

Rural localities in Yeravninsky District